Soum may refer to:

Places
 Sum (administrative division) (сум; also spelt "soum") of Mongolian inhabited areas, both in Mongolia, in the People's Republic of China (Inner Mongolia), and in Russia
 Soum, Boulkiemdé, Burkina Faso
 Soum Province, Burkina Faso

People
 Soum Bill, Ivorian singer
 Henry Soum (1899–1983), Monaco politician

Other uses
 Soum (currency) (also spelled "sum" or "som"), a traditional Turkic unit of currency

See also

 Som (disambiguation)
 Sum (disambiguation)
 Sume (disambiguation)